Stuartburn is a rural municipality (RM) located in the Eastman Region of Manitoba, Canada. It had a population of 1,629 according to the Canada 2006 Census.

The municipality is named after the Ukrainian-Canadian village of Stuartburn within the RM, supposedly named for an early settler called William H. Stuart.

History 
The first settlers to the area of current-day Stuartburn arrived in August 1896 from Ukraine. This first settlement consisted of 26 families, followed by other groups from Ukraine in subsequent months. The settlement expanded eastward and northward, and by the end of 1900, the number of settlers reached approximately 3000. The first Ukrainian Orthodox Church was built in the vicinity of Gardenton in 1897; and the first Ukrainian Catholic Church began construction in 1899 and completed in 1902 in the vicinity of Stuartburn.

The Rural Municipality of Stuartburn was organized on 15 January 1902, disorganized in 1928, became the Local Government District of Stuartburn on 1 January 1945, and then was reorganized as the Rural Municipality of Stuartburn on 1 January 1997.

Geography
According to Statistics Canada, the RM has an area of 1,161.65 km2 (448.52 sq mi). There are no separately incorporated cities, towns, or villages within the municipality. A small portion of Sandilands Provincial Forest lies in its northeast corner. The Manitoba Tall Grass Prairie Preserve and Tallgrass Aspen Parkland are also found within the municipality.

Stuartburn is one of three municipalities in Manitoba bordering the U.S. state of Minnesota; however, none of the international border crossings between Manitoba and Minnesota are located in Stuartburn.

Communities 
Stuartburn includes the following communities:
Arbakka
Caliento
Gardenton
Rofton
Sirko
Stuartburn
Sundown
Vita
Zhoda (part)

Demographics 

References

External links
 Official website
 Stuartburn, MB Community Profile
 Map of Stuartburn R.M. at Statcan

Rural municipalities in Manitoba
Ukrainian-Canadian communities in Manitoba